Our Story Our Voice is a 2007 independent political documentary that looks at the social tension in the world today. The film offers a dialogue with the marginalized voices that are rarely heard in mainstream media. The film looks at topics from nuclear weapons proliferation to the hypocrisy of western foreign policy, failure of plurality, democracy, multiculturalism, trade crisis and also the crisis in Darfur.

Soundtracks
 "Business Sense" - Poppy Seed
 "Into the Beyond" - Tunde Jegede
 "If I…" - Ocacia
 "Birkama" - Ocacia

External links
 Official website
 British Catalogue
 

2007 films
British independent films
Films directed by Owen 'Alik Shahadah
2000s English-language films
2000s British films